John Manners Tollemache (c. 1768 – 13 February 1837), born John Manners, was a British gentleman and politician. He was the second son of John Manners and Louisa Tollemache, 7th Countess of Dysart.

Through the interest of his elder brother, Sir William Manners, 1st Baronet, he was returned as Member of Parliament for Ilchester from 1804 until 1806.

On 19 August 1806, he married Mary Bechenoe (d. 1838), but the couple had no children.

References
Descendants of Sir Robert de Manners, of Etal

 The House of Commons 1790-1820, edited by R.G. Thorne (Secker & Warburg 1986) 

1760s births
1837 deaths
Members of the Parliament of the United Kingdom for English constituencies
UK MPs 1802–1806
J
John Manners Tollemache
Younger sons of earls